Ethel Mary Rankin  (née Stock, 28 August 1893 – 5 December 1956), was a British politician.

Early life
Rankin was born and grew up in Braintree, in Essex.

Career
She was living in Fulham by 1934, when she was elected to Fulham Metropolitan Borough Council for the Labour Party.  In 1945, she was appointed to the Central Health Services Council.

In 1949, Rankin was elected as a member of the London County Council (LCC) from 1949, for Fulham West and later its successor seat, Fulham, and the LCC's vice chairman from 1955, serving until her death in 1956.

Rankin was the Mayor of Fulham for 1954/55, and in 1955 was made a Freeman of the Borough of Fulham.  She was also a justice of the peace. Ethel Rankin Court is a block of flat built by the Council, and named in her honour, in Landridge Road, Fulham.

Personal life
In 1917, she married Walter Rankin, a printer and politician, who was also an LCC member for Fulham, winning a by-election occasioned by her death. They had one son.

References

1893 births
1956 deaths
Place of birth missing
Place of death missing
Labour Party (UK) councillors
Members of London County Council
English justices of the peace
Councillors in Greater London
Women councillors in England